Kazemabad (also Romanized as Kāz̧emābād) is a village in Bezenjan Rural District, in the Central District of Baft County, Kerman Province, Iran. At the 2006 census, its population was 27, in 5 families.

References 

Populated places in Baft County